Futsal Ekstraklasa is the premier futsal league in Poland. It was founded November 6, 1994. Organized by the Futsal Ekstraklasa Sp. z o.o. and is played under UEFA and FIFA rules, currently the league consists of 14 teams.

Champions

External links
 futsalplanet.com

Futsal competitions in Poland
futsal
Poland
1994 establishments in Poland
Sports leagues established in 1994